Konstantin Mikhailovich Veselovskiy (born 21 April 1974 in Moscow) is a former Russian football player.

References

1974 births
Footballers from Moscow
Living people
Soviet footballers
Russian footballers
FC Lokomotiv Nizhny Novgorod players
Russian Premier League players
FC Dynamo Stavropol players
FC Moscow players
Association football forwards
FC Spartak-2 Moscow players